Palmerston Rovers Football Club are a soccer club based in Palmerston, Northern Territory, Australia. They were formed in 2018 after the merger between Palmerston FC and Darwin Rovers.

References

External links

Soccer clubs in the Northern Territory
Association football clubs established in 2018
2018 establishments in Australia
Palmerston, Northern Territory